The Parazinho Biological Reserve is a biological reserve in the state of Amapá, Brazil. It protects an island at the mouth of the Amazon River.

Location

The Parazinho Biological Reserve is in the municipality of Macapá, Amapá.
It covers an island on the north shore of the mouth of the Amazon River.
The island formed in the Quaternary period, and is an example of an alluvial island.
The terrain is flat with clay, silt and sand sediments deposited by the sea and the river.
Soil fertility is poor to moderate.

Environment

Vegetation is pioneer formations of dense tropical rainforest.
The action of waves and tides often causes trees on the coast to fall.
Vegetation includes medium-sized trees, shrubs, some palms, mangroves and reeds.
The reserve supports a program for protecting Amazon turtles.
It supports migratory bird species of the Charadrius, Calidris and Sterna families, and of the laughing gull (Leucophaeus atricilla)  and lesser yellowlegs (Tringa flavipes) species.

History

The Parazinho Biological Reserve was created by state decree 005 of 21 January 1985 on Parazinho Island, in the Bailique Archipelago.
It became part of the Amapá Biodiversity Corridor, created in 2003.

Notes

Sources

Biological reserves of Brazil
Protected areas of Amapá
1985 establishments in Brazil